Radio Edits 1, or simply Edits, was a remix album by American sludge metal band Acid Bath, released in September 1994 to radio stations only for promotional purposes. This album was not available to the general public and was an attempt to get the band more exposure. The four songs on this album were the most popular from the band's first full album, When the Kite String Pops, that were remixed and cleaned up to make them suitable for airing on the radio.

The album artwork was done by the American serial killer Richard "Night Stalker" Ramirez, which attracted controversy at the time.

Track listing
 "Toubabo Koomi" - 4:00
 "The Bones of Baby Dolls" - 3:34
 "Tranquilized" - 3:56
 "The Bones of Baby Dolls" - 3:59
 "Scream of the Butterfly" - 3:52
 "The Bones of Baby Dolls" - 3:56

All music and lyrics by Acid Bath.

Credits

Dax Riggs – vocals
Mike Sanchez – guitar
Sammy Duet – guitar, backing vocals
Audie Pitre – bass, backing vocals
Jimmy Kyle – drums
Spike Cassidy – production, mixing, mastering

References

Acid Bath albums
1994 remix albums
Obscenity controversies in music
Richard Ramirez
Dax Riggs albums
Sludge metal albums